Eric Lindsay Douglas Brownell (7 November 1876 – 22 October 1945) was an Australian-born English cricketer, who played one first-class match, for Worcestershire against Oxford University in 1908. He scored 21 and 7 and took one catch in the second innings, to dismiss Oxford opener Chris Hurst.

Brownell was born in Hobart, Tasmania; he died aged 68 in Windsor, New South Wales.

External links
 
 Statistical summary from CricketArchive

1876 births
1945 deaths
English cricketers
Worcestershire cricketers
Australian emigrants to the United Kingdom